Descendants 2 is an American musical fantasy television film. It premiered as a Disney Channel Original Movie on July 21, 2017, and was simulcast on Disney-owned networks ABC, Disney XD, Freeform, Lifetime, and Lifetime Movies. It is the second installment in the Descendants franchise and the sequel to the 2015 film Descendants. The film stars Dove Cameron, Cameron Boyce, Sofia Carson, Booboo Stewart, Mitchell Hope, and China Anne McClain. A third film, Descendants 3, premiered on August 2, 2019.

Plot 
Mal struggles with her new celebrity life as the girlfriend of King Ben, putting a spell on her hair making it blonde, and uncomfortably maintaining a princess-like personality. She confides her issues in her friends Evie, Carlos, and Jay, but they are content with their new lives in Auradon. Evie scolds Mal for relying on her mother's spell book to solve her issues. Carlos, wishing to ask Jane to the upcoming Cotillion dance, turns to Mal for help. Mal gives him a sweet that will make him speak the truth, but his dog, Dude, eats it, magically speaking the blunt truth in English.

Ben eventually discovers Mal's reliance on magic, and she comes clean about her insecurities, causing a falling-out. Mal returns to the Isle of the Lost, now ruled by her former rival Uma, Ursula's daughter, along with Harry and Gil, the sons of Captain Hook and Gaston. Mal visits hairstylist Dizzy Tremaine, Drizella's daughter, who restores her signature purple hair. Harry learns of Mal's return and informs Uma.

Ben, Evie, Jay, and Carlos learn of Mal's departure and sneak onto the Isle to find her, but Gil recognizes them. Ben confronts Mal, who rejects his feelings for both his sake and Auradon's. Ben leaves dejected, only to be captured by Uma. Mal and Uma arm wrestle for Ben and Fairy Godmother's wand, which Uma wins. Uma then orders Mal and her friends to retrieve the Fairy Godmother's wand in exchange for Ben's safe return. Carlos and Jay return to Auradon Prep, where they create a replica of the wand using a 3D printer. They are caught by Lonnie, Mulan's daughter, who blackmails them into letting her come, having previously been rejected from Jay's sports team based on her gender.

Uma tells Ben of her bitterness that she and the others were not chosen to go to Auradon. Ben takes this into account and invites her to Auradon, but Uma instead plots to make her own way there. Mal's group returns, handing over the fake wand in exchange for Ben, but Uma discovers the forgery. The group flee back to Auradon, but Mal and Ben's relationship is still rocky. The villains' children come to terms that they cannot run from their pasts and agree to be honest with themselves and each other. Carlos confesses to Jane but struggles, while Jay appoints Lonnie as the captain of his team.

Aboard a ship during the Cotillion, Ben stuns everyone by appearing with Uma, who he declares as his true love and announces he will destroy the barrier on the Isle. Jane unveils a stained glass display Ben commissioned to show his affection for Mal, who realizes he loved her for who she was all along. Suspecting Uma has given him a love potion, Mal confesses her love for Ben and kisses him, breaking the spell. Enraged, Uma leaps into the water using Ursula's magic seashell necklace to transform into an octopus, and Mal fights back as a dragon. Ben intervenes, quelling the battle, and Uma returns the ring that Ben had originally given her when he had declared her as his true love and leaves. Mal and Ben reunite, Mal surrendering her spell book to Fairy Godmother. Evie requests that Dizzy be allowed to attend Auradon Prep; when Dizzy is offered, she excitedly accepts.

In a mid-credits scene, Uma addresses the audience, promising that the story is not over.

Cast 

 Dove Cameron as Mal, daughter of Maleficent
 Cameron Boyce as Carlos, son of Cruella de Vil
 Sofia Carson as Evie, daughter of The Evil Queen
 Booboo Stewart as Jay, son of Jafar
 Mitchell Hope as Ben, son of Belle and Beast 
 Brenna D'Amico as Jane, daughter of the Fairy Godmother
 Melanie Paxson as the Fairy Godmother, the headmistress of Auradon Prep and Jane's mother
 Bobby Moynihan as the Voice of Dude, Carlos' dog who gains the power of speech.
 Thomas Doherty as Harry Hook, son of Captain Hook
 Dylan Playfair as Gil, son of Gaston
 Dianne Doan as Lonnie, daughter of Fa Mulan and Li Shang
 Jedidiah Goodacre as Chad Charming, son of Cinderella and Prince Charming
 Zachary Gibson as Doug, son of Dopey the Dwarf
 Anna Cathcart as Dizzy Tremaine, daughter of Drizella Tremaine and granddaughter of Lady Tremaine
 Dan Payne as the Beast, Queen Belle's husband and Ben's father
 Keegan Connor Tracy as Belle, Beast's wife and Ben's mother
 China Anne McClain as Uma, daughter of Ursula

Production

Development 
At the 2015 D23 Expo, Disney announced that a Descendants sequel film had been ordered. An official announcement was made on Disney Channel's Facebook page on October 15, 2015. Deadline Hollywood reported that Parriott and McGibbon would return as screenwriters and executive producers for the sequel and that the cast from the first film was expected to return.

According to China Anne McClain, the post-credits scene featuring Uma saying to the public that "You didn’t think this was the end of the story?" was not included in the original script that she read. However, it was eventually decided to include it in order to foreshadow a possible further sequel, like in the case of the original film.

Casting 
On June 10, 2016, China Anne McClain, who was already voicing Freddie on the Descendants spinoff series Descendants: Wicked World, was announced to be playing Ursula's daughter, Uma, in Descendants 2. In July 2016 it was revealed that Thomas Doherty would play the role of Harry, the son of Captain Hook. In August 2016, Sarah Jeffery who portrays Audrey revealed that she would not be returning, while Brenna D'Amico revealed that she would be returning in Descendants 2, as were Dianne Doan, Jedidiah Goodacre, and Zachary Gibson. On July 19, 2017, it was announced on The View that Whoopi Goldberg would be providing the voice for Ursula, the Sea Witch and Uma's mother.

Filming 
Filming began on September 8, 2016, and, like Descendants, mostly took place in Vancouver and Victoria, Canada.

Broadcast 
Descendants 2 made its debut on Disney Channel in Canada on July 21, 2017, at the same time as the United States. In the United States, the film premiered simultaneously across six-Disney owned networks: Disney Channel, Disney XD, Freeform, ABC, Lifetime, and Lifetime Movies. On Disney Channel, the film premiered alongside the world premiere of Raven's Home, which premiered immediately after. In the UK, the film premiered on Disney Channel and Disney XD on October 20, 2017. In South Africa, the film premiered on October 6, 2017. In India, the film premiered on December 23, 2018, on Disney International HD.

Home media 
Descendants 2 was released on DVD on August 15, 2017. The film sold 123,760 DVDs in its first week, making it the most sold film in the United States. Overall, the film sold 837,912 DVDs and made $13 million through home media releases.

Reception

Ratings 
In total, the film was viewed by 8.92 million viewers across six networks on the night of its premiere, up from its predecessor in 2015; at least 13 million people watched a minute of the film. On Disney Channel, the film was watched by 5.33 million viewers, and topped the night on cable television, receiving a 1.20 rating. Although down from the first film, it was the most-viewed telecast on the network since the first film. ABC's broadcast of the film received a 0.6/3 rating/share, drawing 2.41 million viewers; 0.47 million viewers watched the film on Disney XD with a 0.12 rating, 0.30 million viewers watched the film on Lifetime with a 0.09 rating, 0.26 million viewers watched the film on Freeform with a 0.08 rating, and 0.15 million viewers watched the film on Lifetime Movies with a 0.05 rating. In delayed viewing, the film rose to a total of 21 million viewers.

On Disney Channel, the film placed second in the week of its DVR ratings, jumping 92% to a 2.3 rating, and topped the week in viewer gains, jumping 104% with an additional 5.54 million viewers, the biggest viewer gain on cable television in two years, totaling to 10.90 million viewers on Disney Channel. On Freeform, the film jumped 207% with an additional 0.54 million viewers, totaling to 0.80 million viewers on the network; on Lifetime Movie Network, the film gained 96% with an additional 0.14 million viewers, totaling to 0.29 million viewers on the network.

Accolades

Soundtrack 

Descendants 2 (Original TV Movie Soundtrack) is the soundtrack accompanying the film of the same name. The soundtrack and lead single, "Ways to Be Wicked", was announced on April 12, 2017. The soundtrack was released on July 21, 2017.

Sequel 

On February 16, 2018, Disney Channel announced that a sequel, Descendants 3, was scheduled to premiere mid-2019.  It premiered on August 2, 2019.

Novel: Rise of the Isle of the Lost 
A prequel novel called Rise of the Isle of the Lost was released on May 23, 2017. The novel details Uma's rise to power and her earlier history with Mal. The main plot details Uma planning to get the migrating trident of King Triton in order to help bring down the barrier surrounding the Isle of the Lost.

In addition to the mentioning of Genie, Grumpy, and Merriwether being teachers at Auradon Prep, a third school called the Serpent Preparatory School for the Education of Miscreants is located on the Isle of the Lost which Uma, Harry Hook, and Gil attended. Serpent Prep is a rival of Dragon Hall.

The book also introduced Yen Sid's Auradon intern Sophie, Ariel's niece Arabella, and Mulan and Shang's son Li'l Shang who is Lonnie's brother. There was a mentioning that the Stabbington brothers from Tangled are also on the Isle of the Lost where they have Stabbington Cousins. Other information listed here that was later referenced in the film was Audrey and Chad breaking up, the introduction of R.O.A.R., Mal keeping Maleficent's lizard form as a pet, and Evie having her magic mirror placed in the museum.

References

External links 
 

2017 fantasy films
2010s musical films
2017 television films
American crossover films
American fantasy films
American sequel films
Disney Channel Original Movie films
Films based on fairy tales
Films directed by Kenny Ortega
Films shot in Vancouver
Television sequel films
Simulcasts
Descendants (franchise)
Fantasy crossover films
Musical television films
2010s American films